State Route 23 (SR 23) is a state highway in the U.S. state of California that connects the Pacific coast and the Santa Monica Mountains to the Conejo and Santa Clara River valleys. It runs from Pacific Coast Highway (State Route 1) in Malibu in Los Angeles County to Ventura Street (State Route 126) in Fillmore in Ventura County.

Route description

SR 23 consists of three distinct sections. The southern section begins as Decker Canyon Road near Trancas in Malibu, where SR 23 intersects with the Pacific Coast Highway (State Route 1), or "PCH." This portion provides numerous vistas of the Santa Monica Mountains and the Pacific Ocean during the daytime, but extreme caution is advised, especially as the road nears PCH. It is a notoriously dangerous road, and the rusted chassis of cars that have gone over the side can still be seen. Philip Taylor Kramer, bassist with the rock band Iron Butterfly from 1974–1977, allegedly committed suicide by driving his van over the side along this route. Along its steep and winding path through the Santa Monica Mountains as an increasingly tight and twisting canyon road until its intersection with Potrero Road, SR 23 becomes Westlake Boulevard, where it departs Los Angeles County for Ventura County and heads roughly two miles northeast through the Westlake section of Thousand Oaks, a developed residential community. SR 23 then merges with Ventura Freeway (U.S. Route 101) and runs concurrently with it north to the Moorpark Freeway.

The middle section is a major route for traffic headed between Thousand Oaks and Moorpark. It starts in Thousand Oaks, splitting off from the concurrency with US 101 and heading north, with three lanes in both directions. This section terminates at the exit for Los Angeles Avenue when the freeway turns east to become the Ronald Reagan Freeway (State Route 118). Funding for widening of the freeway was approved August 18, 2005, with construction to begin in February 2006, to be completed in 2009. The widening was completed ahead of schedule in April 2008. However, traffic along this freeway during rush hour is extremely congested, particularly near the interchange with US 101.

The northernmost section begins at State Route 118 in Moorpark (called Los Angeles Avenue in Moorpark), and heads north as Grimes Canyon Road through orange groves and sandstone cliffs. In Fillmore, it terminates at State Route 126. The road in Fillmore actually continues past Route 126 up to the foot of the Los Padres National Forest.

On SR 23 from Tierra Rejada Road to Olsen Road (and vice versa) is a bike lane. After crossing Tierra Rejada Road (going north) and Olsen Road (going south), bicyclists are prohibited from crossing.

SR 23 is part of the California Freeway and Expressway System, and the freeway portion is part of the National Highway System, a network of highways that are considered essential to the country's economy, defense, and mobility by the Federal Highway Administration. SR 23 is known as the Military Intelligence Service Memorial Highway from US 101 to California Route 118, in honor of the Military Intelligence Service, the 100th Infantry Battalion, and the 442nd Regimental Combat Team, composed entirely of Japanese Americans.

History
State Route 23 has been designated as such since 1934. However, at this time it was also designated as Legislative Route 155. The freeway portion of SR 23 opened in several phases between 1971 and 1994. Before then, SR 23 ran along Moorpark Road and intersected with U.S. 101 near Newbury Park, although it still ran concurrently with U.S. 101, which was then an expressway.

SR 23 was designated as part of the Freeway and Expressway System in 1959.

Decker Freeway

The Decker Freeway was an unbuilt north–south freeway that would connect SR 118, US 101, and SR 1. The freeway was part of a 1958 plan by the Metropolitan Engineering Board, but was later considered to be geographically improbable and the plans were abandoned.
The freeway's southern portion, from SR 1 to US 101, follows the general alignment of Decker Canyon Road and Westlake Boulevard, a segment of SR 23. It would continue north before terminating at SR 118 near First Street.

Major intersections

See also

References

External links

Caltrans: Route 23 highway conditions
California Highways: SR 23
California @ AARoads.com - State Route 23
Motorcycle Vlog: Riding Towards the Coast on SR-23

023
State Route 023
State Route 023
023
Santa Monica Mountains
Conejo Valley
Fillmore, California
Malibu, California
Moorpark, California
Transportation in Thousand Oaks, California